Sir James Altham (died 1617) was an English judge and briefly a member of the Parliament of England.  A friend of Lord Chancellor Francis Bacon, Altham opposed Edward Coke but advanced the laws of equity behind the fastness of the Exchequer courts, so long considered almost inferior.  Through advanced Jacobean royalism he helped to prosecute the King's enemies and centralise royal power of taxation.

Early life
Altham was descended from Christopher Altham of Girlington, in the West Riding of Yorkshire. He was the third son of James Altham of Mark Hall, Latton, in Essex, Sheriff of London in 1557–58, and sheriff of Essex in 1570, by Elizabeth Blancke, daughter of Thomas Blancke of London, Haberdasher, and sister of Sir Thomas Blanke, who was Lord Mayor of London in 1583. 
The Blanke family lived at the historic site of Abbot Waltham's house in the London parish of St.Mary-at-Hill.

Altham was educated at Trinity College, Cambridge, entered Gray's Inn in 1575 and was called to the bar in 1581.  He is mentioned in Croke's reports for the first time as arguing a case in the Queen's Bench in 1587.  Shortly before he entered the Commons, he was made an Ancient of Gray's Inn, granting superior status over juniors at the all-important dinners.  In 1589, he was elected M.P. for Bramber in Sussex. For some unknown reason there are no surviving records of Altham's activities during the sessions.  All that has come down is his drafting of seven bills for the Parliament of 1601, during which Robert Cecil, Earl of Salisbury passed some of the most significant social laws of the period.

Legal career
He was appointed reader at Gray's Inn in 1600, and in 1603 double reader (duplex lector). In the same year he was made serjeant-at-law.  On 1 February 1607 he was appointed one of the barons of the exchequer, in succession to Sir John Savile, and knighted.  In 1610, a question having arisen concerning the power of the crown to impose restrictions on trade and industry by proclamation, the two chief justices, the chief baron, and Baron Altham were appointed to consider the matter. The result of their consultation was that they unanimously resolved "that the king by his proclamation cannot create any offence which was not an offence before ...  That the king hath no prerogative but that which the law of the land allows him ... and lastly, that if an offence be not punishable in the Star Chamber, the prohibition of it by proclamation cannot make it punishable there."’

Altham was one of the judges whose opinion was taken in 1611 by Lord Chancellor Ellesmere on the case of the heretics Bartholomew Legate and Edward Wightman, whom Archbishop Abbot wanted burned. Altham was reputed hostile to Edward Coke, who was deliberately not consulted. The two men were burned, one at Smithfield, the other at Burton-upon-Trent.

Altham's signature, together with those of the other twelve judges, is appended to the letter to the king relative to his action in the commendam case, in which the power of the crown to stay proceedings in the courts of justice in matters affecting its prerogative is denied. A serjeant-at-law, in arguing a case involving the right of the crown to grant commendams, i.e. licences to hold benefices that otherwise would be vacated, had in the performance of his duty disputed, first, the existence of any such prerogative except in cases of necessity; secondly, the possibility of any such case arising. The thereupon wrote by his attorney-general, Francis Bacon, a letter addressed to Lord Coke requiring that all proceedings in the cause should be stayed. This letter having been communicated to the judges, they assembled, and after consultation the letter already mentioned was sent to the king. The king replied by convening a council and summoning the judges to attend thereat. They attended, and, having been admonished by the king and the attorney-general, all, with the exception of Coke, fell upon their knees, acknowledged their error, and promised amendment.

Altham died on 21 February 1617, and the lord keeper, Sir Francis Bacon, in appointing his successor, characterised the late baron as "one of the gravest and most reverend of the judges of this kingdom." He was buried in Oxhey Chapel, built by himself on his estate at Oxhey in Hertfordshire, where a monument still preserves his memory and that of his third wife, who died on 21 April 1638.

Family life
By his first wife, Margaret, daughter of Oliver Skinner, Altham had issue one child only, a son James, afterwards Sir James Altham of Oxhey, knight. This Sir James Altham married Elizabeth, daughter of Sir Richard Sutton of London, and had issue a boy, who died in infancy, and two daughters, Elizabeth and Frances.

Elizabeth Altham married Arthur Annesley, 1st Earl of Anglesey, second Viscount Valentia and first Earl of Anglesey, whose second son, Altham Annesley, was created in 1680 Baron Altham of Altham, with limitation in default of male issue to his younger brothers. His only son dying in infancy, the title devolved upon the younger branch of the Annesley family, who subsequently succeeded to the earldom of Anglesey. The earldom lapsed in 1771, when the English House of Lords decided against the legitimacy of the last claimant.

Frances, the second daughter of Sir James Altham of Oxhey, married Richard Vaughan, 2nd Earl of Carbery. The title lapsed in 1713.

By his second wife, Mary, daughter of Richard Stapers, Esq., Altham had three children, a son Richard, who died without issue; two daughters, Elizabeth and Mary. Elizabeth married first Sir Francis Astley of Hill Morton and Melton, knight, then Robert Digby, 1st Baron Digby (c. 1599–1642) (Irish peerage), and lastly Sir Robert Bernard, 1st Baronet, serjeant-at-law. Mary married Sir Francis Stydolph (d. 1655) and was the mother of Sir Richard Stydolph, Baronet.

By his third wife, Helen Saunderson, Altham had no children.

Robert Altham, currently a circuit judge is one of his descendants.

References

Further reading
 G.R.Corner, Archaeologia, xxxvi, 400-417.

1617 deaths
Year of birth missing
16th-century births
16th-century English judges
17th-century English judges
English MPs 1589
Members of Gray's Inn
Barons of the Exchequer
Knights Bachelor
English barristers
Alumni of Trinity College, Cambridge
Serjeants-at-law (England)